White tiger's milk is a traditional English alcoholic beverage that usually contains brandy, eggs and milk.

References

Mixed drinks